A Wild Bird or Her Adopted Son (Swedish: En vildfågel) is a 1921 Swedish silent drama film directed by John W. Brunius and starring Tore Svennberg,  Pauline Brunius and Paul Seelig. It was shot at the Råsunda Studios in Stockholm. The film's sets were designed by the art directors Vilhelm Bryde and Axel Esbensen.

Cast
 Tore Svennberg as 	Richard Brenner
 Pauline Brunius as 	Bertha Brenner
 Paul Seelig as Paul Hennings
 Renée Björling as 	Alice Brenner
 Jenny Tschernichin-Larsson as Old Hanna
 Nils Lundell as 	Old Man
 Bror Berger as First Mate
 Edvin Adolphson as 	Guest
 Gösta Cederlund as 	Guest
 Arthur Natorp as Guest
 Gull Natorp as 	Guest

References

Bibliography
 Sadoul, Georges. Dictionary of Film Makers. University of California Press, 1972.

External links

1921 films
1921 drama films
Swedish drama films
Swedish silent feature films
Swedish black-and-white films
Films directed by John W. Brunius
1920s Swedish-language films
Silent drama films
1920s Swedish films